Anthony J. "A.J." Edgecomb is an American politician from Maine who formerly represented Maine District 148 in the Maine House of Representatives. He resides in the city of Fort Fairfield. He is a Republican and was first elected to the House in 2014.  He is the grandson of Maine politician Peter Edgecomb.

At 21 years old, he became the youngest member of Maine's House of Representatives for District 148.

References

Year of birth missing (living people)
Living people
Maine Republicans
People from Fort Fairfield, Maine
21st-century American politicians